Enteromius bawkuensis is a species of ray-finned fish in the genus Enteromius. It is only known from the White Volta and the Sokoto River, a tributary of the Niger in Burkina Faso, Ghana and Nigeria.

References 

Enteromius
Fish described in 1965